Thomas Freeman (16 April 1923 – 20 June 2003) was a New Zealand cricketer. He played seventeen first-class matches for Otago between 1943 and 1950.

Freeman was born at Balclutha in Otago in 1923 and educated at Otago Boys' High School in Dunedin. He worked as a teacher. Following his death in 2003 an obituary was published in the 2004 New Zealand Cricket Annual. Freeman's son, Barry Freeman, also played for Otago.

References

External links
 

1923 births
2003 deaths
New Zealand cricketers
Otago cricketers
Sportspeople from Balclutha, New Zealand
South Island cricketers